Schmutzler is a German surname. Notable people of the surname include the following: 

Fabian Schmutzler
Leopold Schmutzler
Nadine Schmutzler
Robert Schmutzler
Sabrina Schmutzler
Siegfried Schmutzler

German-language surnames